Sir Cecil Clementi  (1 September 1875 – 5 April 1947) was a British colonial administrator who served as Governor of Hong Kong from 1925 to 1930, and Governor and Commander-in-Chief of the Straits Settlements from 1930 to 1934.

Early life and education
Born in Cawnpore (presently Kanpur), India, Clementi was the son of Colonel Montagu Clementi, Judge Advocate General in India, and his wife, Isabel Collard. He attended St Paul's School and Magdalen College, Oxford, where he studied Sanskrit and the classics. In 1896, he achieved a first-class result in mods, and was awarded a Boden Scholarship in Sanskrit in 1897.  He received honorable mentions for the Hertford (1895), Ireland (1896) and Craven (1896) scholarships.

Clementi was proxime accessit (runner-up) for the Gaisford Greek Prose prize in 1897, and obtained his B.A. (2nd class lit. hum., i.e. classics) in 1898. He was also proxime accessit for the Chancellor's Latin Essay prize in 1899, and obtained his M.A. in 1901.

Early colonial service
In 1899, Clementi placed fourth in the competitive examinations for the civil service, which allowed him his choice of postings. His choice was Hong Kong, and upon his arrival he was sent up to Canton, where he was a land officer until forced to return to Hong Kong by the events of the Boxer Rebellion. Clementi's facility with languages was demonstrated when he passed the Cantonese examination in 1900, and the Pekingese examination six years later, in 1906.

After serving as an Assistant Registrar General in 1901, Clementi joined as a member of the Board of Examiners in Chinese, in 1902. In 1902, Clementi was seconded for special service under government of India and was created J.P. in that same year. A year later, he was seconded for famine relief work in Kwangsi (Guangxi). A year afterwards, Clementi was appointed Member of Land Court, Assistant Land Officer and Police Magistrate at New Territories, Hong Kong, a position he served in until 1906.

Due to his performance in the services, Clementi was promoted to Assistant Colonial Secretary and Clerk of Council, in 1907. While he was in that position, Clementi represented the Hong Kong government in the International Opium Conference at Shanghai, in 1909. A year later, he became the Private Secretary to the Administrator at that time, Sir Francis Henry May. Clementi eventually became Acting Colonial Secretary and Member of both the Executive and Legislative Councils of Hong Kong. He would remain there until 1912.

Clementi played a part in the founding of the University of Hong Kong. Indeed, he wrote the words, in Latin, of the University Anthem, first performed 11 March 1912.

In 1913, Clementi was appointed colonial secretary of British Guiana, a post he held until 1922. From there he was named the colonial secretary of Ceylon, where he served until 1925. Each position imparted considerable responsibility, and on more than one occasion he was in charge of administering the entire government of his area of responsibility. Whilst in Ceylon he served as president of the Ceylon Branch of the Royal Asiatic Society in 1924.

Governor of Hong Kong
In 1925, Clementi was appointed as Governor of Hong Kong, a position to which his fluency in Cantonese suited him well and in which he served until 1930.
    
During his tenure, the Canton–Hong Kong strike, which crippled the Hong Kong economy, was resolved and Kai Tak Airport entered operation (it would operate until Hong Kong International Airport opened and took over as the main airport in 1998). He also notably ended the practice of Mui Tsai, the traditional Chinese "female maid servitude" system which often resulted in the abuse of young servant girls. He also appointed Shouson Chow, a prominent Chinese merchant, as the first unofficial member of the Executive Council. At the same time, he increased the numbers of official and non-official ("Unofficial") members in the Legislative Council from eight to ten (including the Governor) and from six to eight, respectively. He invited one Chinese and one Portuguese (Jose Pedro Braga) to be Unofficials.

Clementi opposed Kuomintang's 1926 Northern Expedition against northern Chinese warlords and advocated British arms support to Peking, a move rejected by London.  To counter the growing radicalization of the Chinese intelligentsia against colonialism and imperialism after the May Fourth Movement, he proposed a revised school curriculum in Chinese language that stressed loyalty and traditional Chinese values. He advocated for the training of more teachers in the Chinese language and the establishment of a Chinese Department at the University of Hong Kong.

Governorship of the Straits Settlements

After his tenure as Governor of Hong Kong ended, Clementi went on to serve his last post in the Colonial Services as Governor and Commander-in-Chief of the Straits Settlements, which included Singapore, and High Commissioner for the Malay States, from 5 February 1930 to 17 February 1934. He handed over to Sir Andrew Caldecott, who become acting Governor, and left for England due to his illness. The position of Governor was later filled by Sir Shenton Thomas on 9 November 1934.

Six years later, in 1940, Clementi became the Master of the Mercers' Company.

Personal life
Clementi was the nephew of the Cecil Clementi Smith (1860–1916), Governor of the Straits Settlements and High Commissioner in the period 1887 to 1893. He was also the great-grandson of the Italian-born musician Muzio Clementi.

Clementi married Marie Penelope Rose Eyres, daughter of Admiral Cresswell John Eyres, in 1912. The couple had one son, Cresswell, and three daughters.

Clementi died in High Wycombe, England, on 5 April 1947.

Honours
C.M.G., 1916
K.C.M.G., 1926
G.C.M.G., 1931
K.St.J., 1926
Fellow, Royal Geographical Society (F.R.G.S.)
Member, Royal Asiatic Society (M.R.A.S.)
Honorary Fellow, Magdalen College, Oxford, 1938
Recipient, Cuthbert Peek Award of the Royal Geographical Society, 1912
Honours LL.D. degree, Hong Kong University, 1925

Publications
Cantonese Love Songs. Clarendon Press (1904)
Summary of Geographical Observations taken during a Journey from Kashgar to Kowloon. Noronha & Co. (1911)
Pervigilium Veneris, The vigil of Venus. Blackwell (1911)
Bibliographical and other studies on the Pervigilium Veneris. Blackwell (1913)
The Chinese in British Guiana. The Argosy Company Limited (1915)
Elements in Analysis of Thought. Blackwell (1933) 
A Constitutional History of British Guiana. Macmillan (1937) – a definitive work on the constitution of colonial British Guiana

Namesakes
Clementi Secondary School, Hong Kong
Clementi Road, Hong Kong
Cecil Clementi Street, Kanpur
Sir Cecil's Ride (金督馳馬徑), Hong Kong
 Clementi Town Secondary School, Singapore
Clementi, Singapore
Cecile Mountain, Cameron Highland, Malaysia
Clementi MRT station, Singapore

See also

 History of Hong Kong

References

Governors of British Ceylon
Governors of Hong Kong
Governors of the Straits Settlements
1875 births
1947 deaths
Alumni of Magdalen College, Oxford
British people of Italian descent
Chief Secretaries of British Guiana
Chief Secretaries of Ceylon
Fellows of the Royal Asiatic Society
Fellows of the Royal Geographical Society
Knights Grand Cross of the Order of St Michael and St George
People educated at St Paul's School, London
People from Kanpur
20th-century Hong Kong people
20th-century British politicians
Administrators in British Singapore
Members of the Legislative Council of Ceylon